Oliver Clark (born 17 August 1996) is an Australian professional rugby league footballer who plays as a . He was previously with the Wests Tigers in the National Rugby League (NRL).

Background
Clark was born in Sydney, New South Wales, Australia.

He played his junior rugby league for Quakers Hill Destroyers.

Playing career
In round 9 of the 2019 NRL season, Clark made his NRL debut for the Wests Tigers against the Penrith Panthers at Suncorp Stadium in a 30–4 victory.

On 28 September 2020, Clark was one of eight players who were released by the Wests Tigers.

References

External links
Wests Tigers profile

1996 births
Australian rugby league players
Wests Tigers players
Rugby league props
Western Suburbs Magpies NSW Cup players
Living people
Rugby league players from Sydney